Building the Brand is a ten-part American documentary television series which aired on the now-defunct 3net channel. Each episode visits a factory of a different brand which manufactures some of the world's most iconic products. The series is produced in 3D. The series features the production process as well as interviews with key players at the business.

Broadcast
The series premiered in the U.S. on April 3, 2011 on 3net where it was broadcast in 3D.

Internationally, the series premiered in Australia on Discovery Science on July 23, 2015.

Repeats of the series are currently airing on the digital broadcast network Quest.

Episodes
Episode 1: Winnebago
Episode 2: Gibson Guitars
Episode 3: Pierce Fire Trucks
Episode 4: Chevrolet Corvette
Episode 5: Apache Attack Helicopters
Episode 6: Rolls-Royce
Episode 7: Jack Daniel's
Episode 8: John Deere
Episode 9: Trek Bicycles
Episode 10: Oyster Marine

References

2010s American documentary television series
2011 American television series debuts
2011 American television series endings
3D television shows